Benjamin Rigby is an Australian actor, writer and producer.

Early years and training 
Rigby attended Scots PGC College where he excelled in drama, receiving the Drama Prize in his final year in 2005. He had previously attended Trinity Lutheran School at Ashmore on the Gold Coast. Rigby went on to study a Bachelor of Theatre Arts majoring in acting at University of Southern Queensland, graduating in 2009.

Career 
Since graduating, Rigby has appeared in a wide range of theatre, film, and television. He made his television debut in Neighbours as David Sheridan in 2011. In 2013 Rigby appeared in Miss Fisher's Murder Mysteries as Harry "The Hangman" Harper for the ABC. He appeared as a waiter in Garth Davis's Oscar nominated debut feature Lion. In 2017, Rigby played Ledward in the short film Alien: Covenant - Prologue: Last Supper and co-starred in the sequel to Prometheus, Alien: Covenant.  
In 2016, he wrote, produced and starred in Bridge which made its world premiere at the Palm Springs International Shortfest. He produced, wrote and starred in the short film We're Not Here, which was executive produced by John Logan and won best screenplay at the Sydney Mardi Gras Film Festival as well as playing festivals Melbourne International Film Festival and Outfest among others.
In 2018, Rigby starred in Melbourne Theatre Company's production of Abigail's Party. He appears as Bruce McLaren in the Oscar winning Ford v. Ferrari.

Filmography

Theatre

References

External links 

Australian male television actors
Australian male stage actors
Living people
University of Southern Queensland alumni
Year of birth missing (living people)